Tendosphaeridae is a family of crustaceans belonging to the order Isopoda.

Genera:
 Macrotelsonia Arcangeli, 1939
 Tendosphaera Verhoeff, 1930
 Thrakosphaera Schmalfuss, 1998

References

Isopoda